The German DRG Class 84s were standard (see Einheitsdampflokomotive) goods train tank locomotives with the Deutsche Reichsbahn. A total of twelve engines were placed into service by the Reichsbahn between 1935 and 1937. The machines were given operating numbers 84 001–012. They were worked on the Müglitz Valley Railway (Müglitztalbahn) between Heidenau and Altenberg in the Ore Mountains (Erzgebirge), for which they were specially designed to negotiate tight curves. They were manufactured by the firms of Schwartzkopff and Orenstein & Koppel. One feature was that they were fitted with Schwartzkopff-Eckhardt II bogies.

In the Second World War many of the engines were damaged and had to be sidelined as a result. The vehicles were taken over by the DR in East Germany after the war. The engines were mainly used between Schwarzenberg and Johanngeorgenstadt.

Between 1966 and 1968 all the Class 84 engines were retired apart from one. None, however, has survived.

See also
 List of DRG locomotives and railbuses

References

External links 
 Einheitslok Baureihe 84 Müglitztalbahn

84
2-10-2T locomotives
84
Railway locomotives introduced in 1935
Berliner locomotives
Standard gauge locomotives of Germany
1′E1′ h3t locomotives
1′E1′ h2t locomotives
Freight locomotives